The Euskotren TD2000 series is an electro-diesel locomotive type operated by Euskotren in the Basque Country, Spain.

History
In 2006, Euskotren awarded Ingeteam the construction of 12 diesel-electric locomotives for 37.5 million euros. The first locomotives were delivered in early 2009, and entered service later that year. The purchase has been criticized due to the low usage of the locomotives, caused by an overestimation of rail freight demand.

Due to lack of use, one of the locomotives was leased to FGC from 2012 to 2017, where it served as the FGC 255 series. In 2015, three of the locomotives were converted to  gauge and sold to FE EP, the national railway of Ecuador.

Naming
Each unit is named after a river of the Basque Country.

See also
 Euskotren rolling stock

References

External links
 
 

Diesel-electric locomotives of Spain
Diesel-electric locomotives of Ecuador
TD2000 series
Railway locomotives introduced in 2009
Bo′Bo′ locomotives
Bo-Bo locomotives
3 ft 6 in gauge locomotives
Metre gauge locomotives
1500 V DC locomotives